World Tour Soccer 2, known as World Tour Soccer 06 in North America, is a sports video game developed by London Studio and published by Sony Computer Entertainment exclusively for PlayStation Portable.

Reception

World Tour Soccer 2 received "mixed or average" reviews, according to review aggregator Metacritic.

References

External links

2006 video games
Association football video games
Multiplayer and single-player video games
PlayStation Portable games
PlayStation Portable-only games
Sony Interactive Entertainment games
This Is Football
Video games developed in the United Kingdom
London Studio games